Cedar-Riverside, also referred to as the West Bank, or simply Riverside, is a neighborhood within Minneapolis, Minnesota. Its boundaries are the Mississippi River to the north and east, Interstate 94 to the south, and Hiawatha Avenue and Interstate 35W to the west. It has a longstanding tradition of cultural diversity and settlement, with a robust arts tradition.

Community
Cedar-Riverside is one of the most diverse areas in Minneapolis and the Twin Cities metropolitan area . It is home to a number of the 100 or so different languages that are spoken in the Twin Cities. A vibrant neighborhood, it boasts many restaurants, cafés, bars, and venues for performance art and music.

The Cedar-Riverside neighborhood is historically known for its immigrant population, beginning in the late 1940s post-World War II with immigrants from eastern Europe. With the arrival of many new Cambodian, Somali, and especially Latino immigrants, hospitals now also offer services in other languages to accommodate patients whose mother tongue is not English. Employers such as Amazon have worked with the community to provide jobs and reduce the unemployment rate from 20 percent (in year 2017). Amazon hired 1,500 workers from the Cedar-Riverside job center and initially provided busing for workers to commute to its Shakopee distribution center but cut this service in late 2017.

The neighborhood is part of the University community, and is dominated by the West Bank campus of the University of Minnesota's Minneapolis campus, which includes the Law School, Carlson School of Management, Hubert H. Humphrey Institute of Public Affairs, and West Bank Arts Quarter. The East and West Bank of the U of M are connected by the Washington Avenue Bridge. The acquisition of a number of residential blocks by the University for expansion of the West Bank campus was controversial in the 1960s.

The neighborhood is also home to Augsburg University, a private liberal arts college.

It is served by the Blue and Green light rail lines. Two popular mixed-use bike/pedstrian paths, Hiawatha LRT Trail and Samatar Crossing, also connect the neighborhood to the downtown area and to neighborhoods further south.

Demographics
In the late 19th century, Cedar-Riverside had a sizable Scandinavian immigrant community, most of whose members labored in the Mississippi River's lumber and milling industries. It later evolved into a hub for intellectuals, hippies, radical activists, actors, musicians and artists during the 1960s and 70s. In keeping with its tradition of ethnic and cultural diversity, the neighborhood is today home to the largest immigrant community in the Twin Cities.  Somalis are now the predominant minority group in the area, resulting in the neighborhood being nicknamed "Little Mogadishu."

According to U.S. Census data from the 2017 to 2021 periods, about 51.7% of residents were female and 48.3% were male. Around 39% of residents were foreign-born, the vast majority being of East African extraction. Around 54% of the Cedar-Riverside population spoke a language other than English. According to the American Community Survey 5-year estimates (2016-2020), the top non-English languages spoken in the Cedar-Riverside neighborhood are Somali (spoken by 47.3% of the population), Oromo (5.5%), Arabic (4.3%), Amharic (2.1%) and Spanish (1.4%). 25% cannot speak English fluently. 32.4% of residents have less than a high school degree. 41.4% of households do not own a car.

The neighborhood's overall population has risen at a moderate but steady rate, from 6,368 in 1990 to 9,000 in 2020.

Crime
Crime statistics released by the Minneapolis Police Department for all of its neighborhoods indicate that between January and May 2012, Cedar Riverside had 134 instances of vice, mainly consisting of various forms of theft. Only one homicide was reported over this period. The neighborhood's statistics were comparable to the citywide average, and were a fraction of those of the neighborhood with the highest reported number of incidents, Downtown West.

Overall, according to police, crime peaked in the period between 2002 and 2006, and has steadily declined in the following 5 years. By 2011, instances of serious crime had dropped a reported 40%.

History

The neighborhood has been a port of entry for immigrants since Swedes, Germans, and Bohemians began arriving in large numbers during the late 19th century. Cedar Avenue became a hub of the Minneapolis Scandinavian community in the late 1800s. Swedish, Norwegian, and Danish were spoken in many of the businesses, and in the early days, stars of Swedish American vaudeville entertained at Dania Hall, Mozart Hall and The Southern Theater.

There was Samuelsen’s confectionery and soda shop, Hagen's appliance store, Moberg’s Norwegian deli, and a host of other Scandinavian-owned businesses. On Cedar Avenue was Dania Hall, where the Danish community would meet. An eclectic mix of Gothic and classical styles, the building included a dining hall and kitchen in the basement, commercial space on the first floor, offices for the Society of Dania plus billiard and reading rooms on the second floor. A theater/assembly hall on the third and fourth floors featured Scandinavian vaudeville acts and weekend dances. On the corner of Cedar and Washington, just before the Washington Ave Bridge, was the Breezy Point Tavern owned by Oscar Carlsen, a Norwegian immigrant from the turn of the 20th century. Oscar had come to Minnesota to work in the lumber camps and saved a stake to buy this tavern.

Where men in the community once worked in small businesses, or as skilled tradesmen, and workers for the railroad, flour mills, and breweries, Cedar-Riverside declined as a core community in the 1920s due to the impact of Prohibition on the entertainment district. Into the 1940s, Cedar-Riverside remained heavily Scandinavian. Postwar immigrants from all over Eastern Europe then settled in the area. The junction of Washington Avenue, Cedar Avenue, and 19th Avenue was known as Seven Corners. The Cedar-Riverside area had been known as "Snoose Boulevard" (Snusgatan) because so many Scandinavians lived there.

The West Bank, with the locally infamous Seven Corners district, mouldered into a skid row scene in the 1950s. In the mid-to-late 1960s, the area became the center of the University-oriented counterculture and antiwar movement. It was home to local hippies, protesters, and other anti-establishment groups between the 1960s and early 1970s. During those days, the neighborhood was known as the "Haight-Ashbury of the Midwest."

The West Bank was home to McCosh's secondhand book store, a center for Beat and Hippie left-leaning bookworms, and later Things, probably the first head shop in the Twin Cities, which sold counterculture curios, anti-war buttons and posters, incense and drug paraphernalia. Marijuana, hashish and LSD were readily available in the area after about 1967. A community of hippies — and numerous students and hangers-on who emulated the hippie lifestyle (at least on weekends) — lived in old rental houses in the area and congregated at coffeehouses, such as the Extemporé, The Scholar and the Broken Drum, and at bars, such as the Triangle Bar, the Viking, Caesar's, The Mixers and the Music Bar. (The latter burned down the night Robert Kennedy was assassinated, and eventually was replaced by a "people's park"). The Triangle often featured performers and recording artists Dave Ray, Tony Glover and John Koerner, who had associated to some degree with Bob Dylan during his brief Minneapolis sojourn.

In 1973, the Riverside Plaza apartment complex was opened. Designed by architect and Cedar-Riverside resident Ralph Rapson, the tall buildings with their signature colored panels are a Minneapolis landmark and were featured as the residence of Mary Richards in later seasons of The Mary Tyler Moore Show. Dayton-Hudson corporation (later Target Corporation) was a consultant, then withdrew, for a proposed commercial development in the area in 1974. Many of the businesses that were established during that time — Martha's Antiques, the Whale Leather Shop, the Five Corners Saloon, Richter's Drug Store and Smith's Leather Shop — eventually went out of business, gradually giving way to newer stores and shops. The Depth of Field also closed in the last half of 2019.

The neighborhood's past still has an influence in the present. Some of the businesses in the area harken back to an earlier time, like the worker-controlled punk hangout, Hard Times Café and the now-closed North Country Food Co-Op. In fact, some of the businesses, specifically in the Seven Corners district, use the history to promote their own business, such as the "Legend of the Seven Switchmen."

Fairview Hospital and St. Mary's Hospital figured prominently in the neighborhood, being only a few blocks away. Fairview and St. Mary's, which merged in 1986, later merged with the University of Minnesota Hospitals, forming a major medical complex straddling the Mississippi River. The organization is now known as University of Minnesota Medical Center.

Arts culture

Cedar-Riverside is home to a thriving arts culture. There are many playhouses and theatre groups in the area, including the Mixed Blood Theatre Company, Theatre in the Round, and The Southern Theater. There is also a percolating music scene, with musicians frequenting venues like The Cedar Cultural Center, The Cabooze, The Red Sea, Part Wolf MPLS, Acadia Cafe, and Palmer's Bar.

Additionally, the West Bank music scene is known as a catalyst for major musicians, such as Bonnie Raitt, Leo Kottke, Butch Thompson (Jazz Originals), Peter Ostroushko (Prairie Home Companion), Dave "Snaker" Ray (Koerner, Ray & Glover), Erik Anderson (The Wallets), Dakota Dave Hull, Sean Blackburn (Prairie Home Companion), Bill Hinkley (Minnesota Music Hall of Fame), Karen Mueller (Autoharp Hall of Fame), and, to a lesser extent, Bob Dylan.

Many of these musicians also taught, performed and/or jammed at the West Bank School of Music. The Cedar Cultural Center, Extempore' Coffeehouse, Scholar Coffeehouse, New Riverside Cafe, Viking Bar, 400 Bar, 7 Corners, Whisky Junction, Cabooze and Cedarfest have likewise all been popular music venues in their time. Established in 1978, KFAI community radio has broadcast a mix of community talk radio and folk and avant-garde music from around the world from the Bailey building since 1991.

The arts flavor of the area is enhanced by the presence of Augsburg University and the University of Minnesota's West Bank Arts Quarter, which is home to the University’s arts programs.

Cedar Riverside also plays host to the annual Zombie Pub Crawl. In the 2005 the Minneapolis Zombie Pub Crawl began with about 100 participants. In 2011 Cedar Riverside hosted approximately 18,000 individuals for the seventh annual zombie pub crawl.

Notable establishments

Bedlam Theater, "The Outer Limit of the Local Imagination Since 1992" Permanently Closed - 2016
The Cedar Cultural Center, "The World's Music, Here" 
The Electric Fetus record shop was located at 521 Cedar Avenue from 1968 to 1969 and at 514 Cedar Avenue from 1969 to 1972. 
Hard Times Café, cooperatively owned vegetarian restaurant
The Hub Bike Co-Op, worker owned and operated, "All Types of Bikes for All Types of People"
KFAI, "Radio Without Boundaries"
Mayday Books, "Not Making a Profit Since 1975"
Midwest Mountaineering
Mixed Blood Theatre Company, "Predictably Unpredictable"
 The People's Center "Care when you need it, not just when you can afford it."
People's Center Theater, formerly home to the longest running feminist theater company in the United States.
Radio K, "Real College Radio"
Riverside Plaza
The Southern Theater
Theatre in the Round
Triple Rock Social Club - Permanently Closed - 2017
West Bank School of Music, "The People's Music School" Permanently Closed

See also
Cedar-Riverside (Metro Transit station), light rail station on the METRO Blue Line
West Bank (Metro Transit station), light rail station on the METRO Green Line
Carl G. O. Hansen

References

Further reading

Hansen, Carl G. O. (1956). My Minneapolis: A chronicle of what has been learned and observed about the Norwegians in Minneapolis through one hundred years. Minneapolis: Standard Press. OCLC 2898002

External links

The West Bank District Website
West Bank Business Association Website
Cedar-Riverside Neighborhood Profile
Cedar-Riverside Neighbors Online Forum
West Bank Community Coalition Website
Photos
Dania Hall at the Minnesota Historical Society.
Seven Corners 01 at the Hennepin County Library.
Seven Corners 02 at the Hennepin County Library.
Samuelson's at the Minnesota Historical Society.
The Electric Fetus at the Minnesota Historical Society.
Pedestrian bridge at 5th and Cedar at the Hennepin County Library. 
The New Riverside Cafe
New Riverside Cafe building 1919
New Riverside Cafe 1972
History of the New Riverside Cafe
Articles
Maury Bernstein
The Snoose Boulevard Festival
Book and CD
West Bank Boogie by  Cyn Collins: 2006 survey of the Cedar-Riverside music scene.
Online book
My Minneapolis at the National Library of Norway.
45. The Cedar-Riverside Area

Minnesota populated places on the Mississippi River
Neighborhoods in Minneapolis
African culture in Minnesota
Ethnic enclaves in the United States
Danish-American culture in Minnesota
Norwegian-American culture in Minneapolis–Saint Paul
Swedish-American culture in Minneapolis–Saint Paul